M. R. Štefánik Airport , also called – especially in English – Bratislava Airport or Bratislava-Ivanka, located approximately  northeast of the city center of Bratislava, spanning over the area of three municipalities (Bratislava-Ružinov, Bratislava-Vrakuňa and Ivanka pri Dunaji). It is the main international airport of Slovakia. Shortly after the independence of Slovakia in 1993, it was named after general Milan Rastislav Štefánik, whose aircraft crashed near Bratislava in 1919. The airport is owned and run by Letisko M. R. Štefánika – Airport Bratislava, a.s. (BTS). As of September 2014 the company is fully owned by the Slovak Republic via the Ministry of Transport, Construction and Regional Development.

Bratislava is a base for the Slovak Government Flying Service as well as Ryanair, AirExplore, and Smartwings Slovakia. During a brief period in 2011, the airport was also a secondary hub for Czech Airlines. Two maintenance companies, Austrian Technik Bratislava and East Air Company are also based at the airport. Air Livery has one painting bay for aircraft at the airport. The airport is category 4E for aircraft, and category 7 or 8 on request in terms of potential rescue.

Conversely, Bratislava Airport may serve as a low-cost alternative for people from Vienna and the neighbouring areas.

Location
It is within a one-hour drive of Vienna (Austria), Brno (Czech Republic) and Győr (Hungary), covering a catchment area of four countries. The nearest large international airport is Vienna International Airport approx.  to the west.

History
The first regular flight between Prague and Bratislava started in 1923, by the newly formed carrier Czechoslovak Airlines. At that time the airport for Bratislava was in Vajnory, about 3 km away from the current airport. That airport is now closed. Preparation for the current airport started in 1947 and construction began in 1948. Two runways were constructed (04/22, 1900 m and 13/31, 1500 m) and the airport opened in 1951.

In 2005, the airport served 1,326,493 passengers; and in 2008, 2,218,545 passengers. Nevertheless, due to the economic downturn and the collapse of Slovak Airlines, SkyEurope, Air Slovakia and Seagle Air, the number of passengers has declined to just over 1.4 million in 2012, increasing again after 2014, and in 2018, the airport recorded the highest number of passengers in its history (2,292,712). In January 2019, the only domestic route of Slovakia Bratislava–Košice, and the Prague–Bratislava route were closed down by Czech Airlines.

Ryanair operations 
In October 2005, Ryanair introduced direct flights from Bratislava to Bergamo, London-Stansted and Frankfurt-Hahn. In 2007, the airline operated routes to Bremen, Girona, Bristol, Bergamo, Dublin, London-Stansted, Frankfurt-Hahn, Stockholm-Skavsta and East Midlands. 

The European Commission has opened an investigation in 2008 whether state-owned Bratislava airport provided unlawful financial aid by giving Ryanair a fee discount. Spring 2008 saw the opening of routes to Edinburgh and Birmingham. The airline suspended route to Bremen in May 2008. 

Service to Brussels-Charleroi was introduced in March 2009. Flights to Alicante, Pisa and Düsseldorf-Weeze were opened later in 2009. In November 2009, routes to Bologna, Liverpool, Paris-Beauvais and Rome-Ciampino were introduced.

Following the collapse of SkyEurope Ryanair opened routes to Bari, London-Luton, Málaga, Palma de Mallorca and Trapani in 2010.

In 2011, direct flights to Canary Islands were introduced. Route to Las Palmas lasted for 15 months until May 2012.

Ryanair established a base at the airport in 2015 and added routes to Athens and Madrid.

Route to Berlin-Schönefeld was introduced begging of October 2015 following Schönefeld base expansion.

Services to Corfu and Manchester were opened in April 2016. 

Direct flights to Eilat, Leeds-Bradford and Niš were introduced in Winter 2016.

In 2017 Ryanair added second based aircraft at the airport.

From 29 March 2018, Ryanair started flights to Malta. Bratislava was among the first two routes when Ryanair entered Turkey. Later in 2018 Ryanair opened routes to Burgas, Eidhoven, Pafos and Thessaloniki. Making it 25 in total for summer 2018 season.

Route to Kyiv-Boryspil was introduced begging of Winter 2018.

In 2020, flights to Alghero were introduced.

The airline planned the launch of Bratislava - Lviv route in January 2022. Later in 2022, flights to Copenhagen, Sofia, Lanzarote and Zagreb were launched.

Service to Kaunas was introduced for Summer 2023.

Facilities

Terminals

The airport has one terminal serving arrivals and departures, completed in July 2012 and replacing the original Terminal A, built in 1970 and demolished in January 2011. Terminal B, built in 1994 and designated to serve the non-Schengen arrivals and departures and Terminal C, built in 2006, are both currently out of service.

The current terminal includes 29 check-in desks located on the ground floor of the departures terminal, one of them designated for oversized baggage. In the non-public zones of the waiting area targeted at departing passengers, there are 13 gates, 8 in the Schengen and 5 in the non-Schengen area.

The airport is also home to the General Aviation Terminal (GAT), where passengers on private, business and VIP flights are handled, as well as passengers of emergency flights and crew.

Other facilities

A new control tower was added in the 1990s. The parking lot near the terminal has 970 parking spots and is used for short- and long-term parking. The current capacity of the airport is over 5 million passengers per year. The offices of the Slovak Civil Aviation Authority are on the airport property.

Runways
The current runways enable the landing of virtually all types of aircraft used in the world today (except for Airbus A380, Boeing 747-8 or another aircraft of similar size). The airport features two perpendicular runways (04/22 and 13/31), both of which underwent a complete reconstruction in the 1980s. Runway 13/31 is equipped for the ICAO category IIIA approach and landing, while 04/22 is category I.

Airlines and destinations

The following airlines operate regular scheduled, seasonal, and seasonal charter flights to and from Bratislava:

Statistics

Ground transportation

Buses and coaches
 Bratislava - Public transportation bus No. 61 connects the airport to the city centre and the central railway station during the day. Bus No. 96 operates from Petržalka. At night the airport is served by bus N61 from the central railway station.
 Vienna - Blaguss/FlixBus and Slovak Lines (jointly with Postbus) operate bus lines (25 services a day – approximately once every 45 minutes) to Vienna which stop also at the Vienna International Airport. The journey to Vienna city centre takes between 75 minutes and 90 minutes.
 Other destinations - Slovak Lines also operates to destinations around Slovakia.

Roads
There is also a taxi stand just near the entrance to the airport with Taxi Slovakia company (taxi of other companies can be called by telephone but rates for the airport are usually higher).

Long-term and short-term car parking is provided at the airport, in front of the terminal building.

Accidents and incidents
 On 4 May 1919, M.R. Štefánik crashed on approach to Vajnory Airport, the predecessor to M. R. Štefánik Airport. Many rumors about his death exist.
 On 24 November 1966, an Il-18 on multi-leg TABSO Flight 101 from Sofia to East Berlin via Budapest and Prague crashed into the forested foothills of the Little Carpathians west of the airport, shortly after take-off from Bratislava Airport, where it had been grounded due to bad weather in Prague. All 74 passengers and eight crew members died.
 On 28 July 1976, an Il-18 on ČSA Flight 001 from Prague crashed into the Zlaté Piesky lake just north-west of the airport while executing a go-around. 69 of 73 passengers and six crew members died in the crash. Two passengers later died in the hospital.
 On 7 February 1999, a Boeing 707 aircraft crashed on takeoff from BTS. No one was injured.
 On 6 June 1999, a BAE Hawk 200 aircraft crashed during the SIAD '99 air show, killing the pilot and one female spectator on the ground that was swept off the roof by the explosion.

References

External links

 Official website
 
 

Airports in Slovakia
Buildings and structures in Bratislava
Transport in Bratislava
Airports established in 1951
20th-century architecture in Slovakia
1951 establishments in Slovakia